The Grosvenor Gallery Library (est. 1880) was a circulating library in London in the late 19th century. It was affiliated with the Grosvenor Gallery of art on Bond Street, later moving to South Molton Street. It offered subscribers current periodicals, new books, and a Ladies' Reading Room. Owners and staff included Miss Brinstingl, Coutts Lindsay, Mrs. A.W. Pollard, and Thomas Verrinder.

References

Further reading
 

Subscription libraries in England
Libraries in the City of Westminster
1880 establishments in England
Libraries established in 1880